Destil–Parkhotel Valkenburg was a continental cycling team based in the Netherlands that participates in UCI Continental Circuits races. The team was founded in 2003 under the name of "Apac-Eemland Cycling Team".

The team participated in the men's team time trial at the 2013 UCI Road World Championships and qualified for the 2014 UCI Road World Championships.

Team roster

Major wins 

2005
Grand Prix de Beuvry-la-Forêt, Maint Berkenbosch
Overall Rhône-Alpes Isère Tour, Maint Berkenbosch
2006
Stage 3 Olympia's Tour, Marco Bos
2007
Stage 3 Tour de Berlin, Peter Schulting
Ronde van Overijssel, Marco Bos
2009
Stage 1 Tour de Berlin, Tom Relou
Stage 2 Tour de Berlin, Jelle Posthuma
2010
Overall Tour de Berlin, Marc Goos
Stage 3, Marc Goos
Stage 3 Tour de Gironde, Bert-Jan Lindeman
Overall Mainfranken-Tour, Marc Goos
Prologue, Jarno Gmelich
Stage 2, Marc Goos
Kernen Omloop Echt-Susteren, Peter Schulting
2011
Stage 3 Tour de Berlin, Jasper Hamelink
Stage 4 Czech Cycling Tour, Maurits Lammertink
2012
Overall Carpathia Couriers Path, Maurits Lammertink
Stage 1, Maurits Lammertink
Stage 3 Tour de Gironde, Geert van der Weijst
2013
Stage 4 Tour du Loir-et-Cher, Tom Vermeer
Ronde van Overijssel, Tom Vermeer
Overall Carpathian Couriers Race, Stefan Poutsma
Stage 3, Stefan Poutsma
Stage 4 Tour de Gironde, Geert van der Weijst
Stage 4 Kreiz Breizh Elites, Geert van der Weijst
2014
Stage 1 Tour du Loir-et-Cher, Geert van der Weijst
Stage 2 Carpathian Couriers Race, Jochem Hoekstra
Circuit de Wallonie, Maurits Lammertink
Overall Olympia's Tour, Berden de Vries
Stage 1, Berden de Vries
Stage 2, Team time trial
Overall Tour de Berlin, Jochem Hoekstra
Stage 1, Elmar Reinders
Stage 2 (ITT), Jochem Hoekstra
Stage 2 Tour de Gironde, Rens te Stroet
Stage 5 Tour de Gironde, Geert van der Weijst
 National U23 Time Trial Championships, Steven Lammertink
Stage 4 Czech Cycling Tour, Maurits Lammertink
Stage 5 Dookoła Mazowsza, Maurits Lammertink
2015
Ster van Zwolle, Elmar Reinders
Zuid Oost Drenthe Classic I, Jeff Vermeulen
Overall Carpathian Couriers Race, Tim Ariesen
Stage 3, Twan Brusselman
Ronde van Overijssel, Jeff Vermeulen
Stage 1a Olympia's Tour, Team time trial
Stage 4 Olympia's Tour, Jeff Vermeulen
Stage 2 Paris–Arras Tour, Jeff Vermeulen
Parel van de Veluwe, Jeff Vermeulen
Stage 2 Podlasie Tour, Stefan Poutsma
Stage 2 Dookoła Mazowsza, Stefan Poutsma
2016
Ster van Zwolle, Jeff Vermeulen
Stage 5 Tour du Loir-et-Cher, Jeff Vermeulen
ZODC Zuidenveld Tour, Elmar Reinders
 National U23 Time Trial Championships, Tim Rodenburg
Paris–Tours Espoirs, Arvid de Kleijn
2017
 National Track Championships (Individual pursuit), Dion Beukeboom
2018
Stage 5 Carpathian Couriers Race, Timo de Jong
Stage 2 Tour de Serbie, Maarten van Trijp

References

External links 

UCI Continental Teams (Europe)
Cycling teams based in the Netherlands
Cycling teams established in 2003